Robert Dundas, Lord Arniston (1650–1726) was a Scottish politician and ordinary lord of session.

Life
He was the eldest son of Sir James Dundas, Lord Arniston, by Marion, daughter of Robert, Lord Boyd. He was educated abroad, but returned to Scotland as an adherent of the Prince of Orange, and represented Midlothian in the parliaments of 1700–2 and 1702–7. 

He was appointed an ordinary lord of session, on 1 November 1689, assuming the title of Lord Arniston, and sat on the bench for thirty years. He was fond of retirement and study. Guarini's Pastor Fido was among his favourite books.

By his wife Margaret, daughter of Sir Robert Sinclair of Stevenson, he had six sons, of whom the second, Robert Dundas the elder, became lord president of the court of session, and four daughters. Dundas died on 25 November 1726. His place as Senator of the College of Justice was filled by Hew Dalrymple, Lord Drummore.

Notes

References
; Endnotes:
Collins's Peerage, ed. Brydges, vi. 407
Brunton and Haig, Senators of the College of Justice
Douglas, Baronage, p. 187
Omond, Arniston Memoirs.

1650 births
1726 deaths
Members of the Parliament of Scotland 1689–1702
Members of the Parliament of Scotland 1702–1707
Arniston
Shire Commissioners to the Parliament of Scotland